Baalu may refer to:

 T R Baalu, an Indian politician
 Balu Mahendra, a Tamil movie director